Arthur Albert Rowden Birtles (21 July 1899 – 30 January 1975) was an Australian rules footballer who played for the Richmond Football Club in the Victorian Football League (VFL).

Notes

External links 
		

1899 births
1975 deaths
Australian rules footballers from Victoria (Australia)
Richmond Football Club players
Australian military personnel of World War I